Lac Bay is a shallow bay on the south-eastern coast of the island of Bonaire in the Caribbean Netherlands. It has a fringing reef at its mouth and contains about 100 ha of mangroves as well as a small harbour for fishing vessels. Its seagrass beds are used by sea turtles. It has been designated a Ramsar site as a wetland of international importance.

Birds
The bay has been identified by BirdLife International as a 2,076 ha Important Bird Area (IBA) because it supports populations of threatened or restricted-range bird species, including bare-eyed pigeons, yellow-shouldered amazons and Caribbean elaenias. In the past it has supported breeding tricoloured herons, reddish and snowy egrets and probably yellow-crowned night-herons. It is also the site of a night roost of magnificent frigatebirds, as well as providing feeding habitat for migratory waders.

References

Important Bird Areas of the Dutch Caribbean
Birds of Bonaire
Protected areas of Bonaire
Ramsar sites in the Netherlands